The Gayant was an express train that linked Gare du Nord in Paris, France, with Tourcoing in the department of Nord, also in France.

One year before the creation of the TEE-network the French railway SNCF introduced three Trains d'affaires to link Paris with the industrial area of Nord, near the Belgian border. These trains were scheduled as a morning, midday and evening service in both directions. Initially the services were operated with RGP 600 DMUs. In 1959 these were replaced by locomotive hauled trains consisting of Corail coaches. Although domestic TEE-services were allowed from 1965, the Trains d'affaires were not upgraded to TEEs until 1978. Together with the upgrading to TEE the trains were named. The midday service pair was named Gayant.

References

Works cited

International named passenger trains
Named passenger trains of France
Trans Europ Express
Railway services introduced in 1978